Charles Quinton Murphy (July 12, 1959 – April 12, 2017) was an American comedian, actor, and writer. He was best known as a writer and cast member of the Comedy Central sketch-comedy series Chappelle's Show as well as the co-star of the sitcom Black Jesus. He was the brother of actor and comedian Eddie Murphy.

Early life
Murphy was born on July 12, 1959, in the New York City borough of Brooklyn. His mother Lillian Murphy was a telephone operator and his father, Charles Edward Murphy, was a transit police officer, actor, and comedian.

As an adolescent, Murphy spent ten months in jail. In 1978 on the day of his release, he enlisted in the United States Navy and served for six years as a boiler technician.

Career
Murphy had minor roles in several films in the late 1980s and early 1990s and worked behind the scenes with hip hop group K-9 Posse, a duo composed of his half-brother Vernon Lynch Jr. and Wardell Mahone. On their 1988 self-titled debut, Murphy was credited as the album's executive producer as well as songwriter on "Somebody's Brother" and "Say Who Say What."  He also made an appearance in the video for the duo's first single, "This Beat Is Military." Murphy's first major role in a motion picture was in the 1993 film CB4, playing the antagonist Gusto.

Murphy gained national attention as a recurring performer on Chappelle's Show, particularly in the Charlie Murphy's True Hollywood Stories sketches. In these, Murphy recounts his misadventures as part of his brother's entourage including encounters with various celebrities such as Rick James and Prince. After Chappelle's Show host Dave Chappelle left the show, Murphy and Donnell Rawlings hosted the "lost episodes" compiled from sketches produced before his departure.

In 2005, he appeared in King's Ransom (alongside Anthony Anderson and Jay Mohr). In the film, Murphy portrayed Herb, a gay ex-con who is hired by King (Anderson) to fake his kidnapping. Murphy also did voiceovers for Budweiser radio commercials, provided the voice for Iraq War veteran/criminal Ed Wuncler III on Cartoon Network's Adult Swim series The Boondocks, and the voice for a pimp named Jizzy-B in Rockstar Games' Grand Theft Auto: San Andreas video game. Murphy provided the voice for Spock on the G4TV's Star Trek 2.0 shorts, and the dog in his younger brother Eddie's 2007 film, Norbit.

On March 20, 2009, he began his own sketch comedy series Charlie Murphy's Crash Comedy on Crackle. A stand-up special, Charlie Murphy: I Will Not Apologize premiered on Comedy Central in late February 2010.
Murphy also made special appearances in 1000 Ways to Die and the TBS sitcom Are We There Yet? as Frank Kingston. In 2014–15, Murphy played Vic on the Adult Swim live-action show Black Jesus.

Personal life and death
Murphy was a resident of Tewksbury Township, New Jersey. He was married to Tisha Taylor Murphy from 1997 until her death from cervical cancer in December 2009. The couple had two children together, and Murphy had a child from a previous relationship. He was a karate practitioner.

Murphy died from leukemia on April 12, 2017, at age 57 in New York City, New York.

Filmography

Film

Television

Video games

Music Videos

References

External links
 
 
 Charlie Murphy on the end of Chappelle's Show

1959 births
2017 deaths
African-American male comedians
American male comedians
American male film actors
American male screenwriters
American sketch comedians
American stand-up comedians
African-American screenwriters
Screenwriters from New York (state)
American male voice actors
People from Brooklyn
People from Tewksbury Township, New Jersey
United States Navy sailors
African-American male actors
American male television actors
Male actors from New York City
People from Roosevelt, New York
Comedians from New York City
Deaths from cancer in New York (state)
Deaths from leukemia
American male karateka
20th-century American comedians
21st-century American comedians
20th-century African-American people
21st-century African-American people
African-American male writers
African-American United States Navy personnel